James Roosevelt "Tadd" Roosevelt Jr. (August 20, 1879 – June 7, 1958) was an American heir and automobile worker.

Early life
James Roosevelt Roosevelt Jr. was born on August 20, 1879. He was the son of diplomat James Roosevelt "Rosey" Roosevelt (1854–1927) of the Roosevelt family and Helen Schermerhorn (née Astor) Roosevelt (1855–1893) of the Astor family.  He had one sister, Helen Rebecca Roosevelt (1881–1962).

Among his large and prominent family were uncles Franklin Delano Roosevelt (who was actually three years younger than Tadd), who later became President of the United States, and Colonel John Jacob "Jack" Astor IV, who died during the sinking of the RMS Titanic.   Tadd's paternal grandparents were businessman James Roosevelt I and Rebecca Brien (née Howland) Roosevelt, while his maternal grandparents were businessman William Backhouse Astor Jr. and socialite Caroline (née Schermerhorn) Astor, who was known as the "Mrs. Astor".

He and Franklin both attended Groton School and Harvard University, with Tadd being ahead of Franklin.  Their kinship led to Franklin often being mockingly referred to as "Uncle Frank" while the two attended Groton together.

Career
Upon his mother's death in 1893, Tadd inherited $1,500,000 (equivalent to approximately $ in  dollars).

Personal life
On June 14, 1900, while still a student at Harvard, Roosevelt married a Hungarian-born working class woman, Sadie Messinger (–1940) (said by some to be a prostitute, though this has been disputed).  Tadd's father Rosey, upon learning of the wedding, traveled from Hyde Park and brought Tadd home.  Their union sparked controversy, and Rosey ended up disowning Tadd.

In 1907, Tadd was arrested for speeding on Ocean Parkway in Brooklyn.  In February 1917, Tadd was again arrested in Florida and required to stay in Florida pending a divorce suit. He had lived in Daytona under the name "M. S. King" with another woman.  The Roosevelt family had reportedly opposed the marriage to Sadie and had prevailed in achieving a separation, in which Sadie was to receive a $10,000 (equivalent to $ in  dollars) annual income. A court soon granted $625 (equivalent to $ in  dollars) per month alimony to Sadie, pending settlement of the divorce. At the time, Tadd was reported to be the Floridian paying the highest income taxes, having a $12,000,000 fortune (equivalent to $ in  dollars).

By October 1921, Tadd and Sadie were reportedly no longer living together. However, they remained married until her death. They never had children.

Death
Roosevelt died in Manhattan on June 7, 1958.  A recluse in his later years, his fortune was donated to the Salvation Army.

References

Further reading
Moffat, R. Burnham The Barclays of New york: who they are and who they are not,-and some other Barclays (1904)
Black, Conrad Franklin Delano Roosevelt: Champion of Freedom (2005)
Panchyk, Richard Franklin Delano Roosevelt for Kids: His Life and Times with 21 Activities (2007)

External links

1879 births
1958 deaths
Tadd
Astor family
Livingston family
Schermerhorn family
Harvard University alumni
People from New York City